Mickey's 123: The Big Surprise Party, also known as Mickey 123: L'Anniversaire Surprise in French, is an educational game that was released on Amiga and DOS, developed by Distinctive Software and published by Disney Software in the United States and Infogrames in Europe. The game starred Mickey Mouse throwing a party for his friends. The game is designed for children 2 to 5 years old.

References

1990 video games
Children's educational video games
DOS games
Amiga games
Disney video games
Mickey Mouse video games
Donald Duck video games
Goofy (Disney) video games
Video games about birthdays
Video games developed in Canada
Distinctive Software games
Single-player video games
Infogrames games